Yuki Bhambri is the first winner of the event, defeating Alexander Kudryavtsev in the final 4–6, 6–3, 7–5.

Seeds

Draw

Finals

Top half

Top half

References
Main Draw
Qualifying Draw

Sports competitions in Chennai
2010s in Chennai